"A Cry for Help" is the sixth episode of the first series of the British television series, Upstairs, Downstairs. The episode is set in 1906. It is one of five episodes shot in black-and-white due to an industrial dispute.

"A Cry for Help" was among the episodes omitted from Upstairs, Downstairs''' initial Masterpiece Theatre'' broadcast in 1974, and was consequently not shown on US television until 1989.

Cast
Regular cast
 Hudson
 Mrs Bridges
 Richard Bellamy
 Roberts
 Edward
 Emily

Guest cast
 Raymond Huntley (Sir Geoffrey Dillon)
  Susan Penhaligon (Mary Stokes)
  Nicholas Young (Myles Radford)
  Maisie Trent (Waitress)
  Dennis Plenty
  Ann Plenty
  Grace Dolan (Customers)

Plot
In 1906 Lady Marjorie Bellamy leaves with Rose for the country, but while Rose is gone the new under-house-parlour maid, Mary Stokes, arrives in service pregnant. She says that she has found herself pregnant after being sexually assaulted and raped by Myles Radford, the son of Mary's previous employer and Richard's powerful politician and family friend. Richard Bellamy takes pity on Mary and attempts to help her. But the Radfords refuse to take responsibility and the legal system proves ineffective. Richard finds himself threatened with legal action if he continues with his accusations against Radford and finds himself facing rumours that he was the father. Sir Geoffrey tells Richard to send Mary away, so she quits her job with the Bellamys, but she departs with a small gift of money from some of the servants.

References

Upstairs, Downstairs (series 1) episodes
1971 British television episodes
Fiction set in 1904